The 2009–10 football season in Belgium, which is the 107th season of competitive football in the country and runs from August 2009 until July 2010.

Promotion and relegation
Team promoted to 2009–10 Belgian First Division
 Belgian Second Division Champions: Sint-Truiden

Teams relegated from Belgian First Division 2008–09
 15th Place: Dender (lost playoff)
 17th Place: Tubize
 18th Place: Mons

Teams promoted to 2009–10 Belgian Second Division
 Belgian Third Division A Champions: Standaard Wetteren
 Belgian Third Division B Champions: Turnhout
 Playoff winners: Boussu Dour Borinage

Teams relegated from 2008–09 Belgian Second Division
 18th Place: Deinze
 19th Place: Namur
 Playoff losers: Olympic Charleroi
 Playoff losers: Virton
 Playoff losers: Hamme

Teams promoted to 2009–10 Belgian Third Division
 Belgian Promotion A Champions: Coxyde
 Belgian Promotion B Champions: Temse
 Belgian Promotion C Champions: Heist
 Belgian Promotion D Champions: Bleid
 Playoff winners: Ieper
 Playoff winners: Torhout
 Playoff winners: Hasselt
 Playoff winners: Ternat

Teams relegated from 2008–09 Belgian Third Division
 16th Place in Third Division A: Gent-Zeehaven
 15th Place in Third Division B: Seraing
 16th Place in Third Division B: Union La Calamine
 Playoff losers: Hamoir
 La Louvière went bankrupt and merged with Belgian Promotion team Couillet to  form Couillet La Louvière in the Promotion division.

Honours

League competitions

Belgian First Division

Europa League playoff final

Genk won 5–2 on aggregate.

Testmatches Europa League

Genk won 5–3 on aggregate.

Belgian Second Division

Belgian Third Division

Belgian Third Division A

Belgian Third Division B

Transfers

Notable transfers
With the shrinking of the Belgian First Division from 18 to 16 teams, only few players of relegated teams were able to stay in first division, with Sulejman Smajić arguably the most important one as he moved from Dender EH to Lokeren. After an impressive season, Bryan Ruiz decided it was time to move as the Costa Rican international signed a contract with Twente and thereby left Gent.

At Standard Liège, Oguchi Onyewu moved on a free transfer to AC Milan. To replace him, four Portuguese speaking players were signed, with Ricardo Rocha from Tottenham Hotspur being most known. Club Brugge made some impressive signings as they bought Belgian international Carl Hoefkens together with striker Ivan Perišić who had just helped Roeselare to avoid relegation. Under influence of Dutch coach Adrie Koster, central defender Ryan Donk was also signed.

Most noted signing for Anderlecht was Ondřej Mazuch from Fiorentina. Mouscron was noticed for signing several unknown players from France, Italy and especially Spain, mostly coming from teams in third and fourth division. A few minutes before the deadline, Cercle Brugge and Genk finished negotiations as they formed a deal which meant Thomas Buffel moved from Cercle Brugge to Genk with Hans Cornelis making the opposite move. On top of that Jelle Vossen was loaned out by Genk for a season to Cercle Brugge.

During the first half of the season, Standard signed former French international Olivier Dacourt to replace the injured Steven Defour.

In the winter period, the bankruptcy of Mouscron caused all their players to be contacted by several teams as they were all free to sign new contracts. Club Brugge managed to sign youngsters Maxime Lestienne and Daan van Gijseghem although there was a lot of interest by many clubs, especially for Lestienne. Standard bought Belgian internationals Sébastien Pocognoli and Koen Daerden, while Anderlecht signed a player from fifth division named Paul Taylor and then loaned him to Charleroi. Also returning Belgian internationals were Luigi Pieroni, the 2003–04 Belgian League top scorer, who signed for Gent and Peter Van Der Heyden who signed for Club Brugge.

European Club results
Note that the Belgian team's score is always given first.

Champions Standard Liège were directly qualified for the Champions League while Anderlecht had to start in the qualification rounds. Starting in the new UEFA Europa League were Club Brugge, Gent and Genk.

The Belgian teams had one of their best seasons of the final decade as both Anderlecht, Club Brugge and Standard were not eliminated before winter and played on far into 2010:
 Standard was drawn in a Champions League group with Arsenal, Olympiakos and AZ and started very strong, leading 2–0 versus Arsenal in their first match. However they lost 2–3 and eventually only scored 4 points before the last match at home versus AZ, where they needed a draw not to be eliminated. Goalkeeper Sinan Bolat scored the equalizer five minutes into extra time causing the stadium to burst into joy as Standard moved on into the Europa League knockout stages to meet Austrian team Red Bull Salzburg. After going down 0–2 in the first leg after twenty minutes it did not look good, however they came back to win 3–2 with a stunning goal by Igor de Camargo. In Athens, they beat Panathinaikos 1–3, meaning that the second leg home victory was not even needed. In the quarter finals, they dropped out of the competition to Hamburg. Mladen Petrić ruined all hope of progressing when he scored a second away goal for Hamburg in Liège in the second leg, causing Standard to lose both matches.
 Anderlecht started promising with a 5–0 victory versus Turkish unknowns Sivasspor but then failed to progress past the final qualifying stage of the Champions League as they were beaten by Lyon. They thus dropped into the Europa League group stage. In this group stage they played decent scoring 8 out of 12 points which eventually meant they needed just a draw away to Ajax to qualify. With Ajax already qualified, many spectators feared a 0–0 draw. However youngster Romelu Lukaku quickly put Anderlecht up 0–2 as Anderlecht overpowered Ajax. The match ended 1–3, meaning Anderlecht even won the group. Athletic Bilbao was held to a 1–1 draw in Spain before they were beaten 4–0 in Belgium in the knockout stages. Jonathan Legear scoring the 4–0 with a beauty from at least 25 meters. After this Anderlecht fell to Hamburg, the 4–3 victory in Anderlecht not being enough after the 3–1 loss in Hamburg.
 Club Brugge started rather weak in the Europa League qualifying rounds, squeezing past Finland's Lahti with a last-minute goal in Bruges and then needed penalty kicks to get past Poland's Lech Poznan. In the group stage they faced Shakhtar Donetsk, Toulouse and Partizan Belgrade. After a 1–4 home loss to Shakhtar Donetsk it looked dull, but hopes were back up as they scored a last minute equalizer in Toulouse through Perisic. Joseph Akpala had scored a stunning beauty earlier in the match, kicking the ball into the goal from about 25 meters. Two victories versus Partizan and a 0–0 draw versus Shakthar in Ukraine caused them just to need a draw in their last match at home versus Toulouse. Being the better team throughout the match but not being able to score it looked like a 0–0 was going to be the final score, however again Ivan Perisic gave the fans something to cheer about as he scored the 1–0 winning goal in the final few minutes. Club Brugge thus progressed to the knockout stage where they were massive underdogs versus Valencia. However, after a 1–0 win at home they believed they could go through. In Valencia it also ended 1–0 after 90 minutes, however in the extra-time Valencia managed to score two more. Goalkeeper Stijn Stijnen was praised by players and supporters of both teams for his outstanding performance as Valencia had created dozens of chances throughout both matches.
 In the Europa League qualifying rounds, Genk and Gent also took part: Genk lost twice to Lille, while Gent struggled to get past Naftan from Belarus, before getting clobbered 1–7 at home to AS Roma.

European qualification for 2009–10 summary

National teams

Belgium
As interim coach Franky Vercauteren chose to resign after the loss in Armenia, prompting already signed Dick Advocaat to start already, although his contract started only on 1 January 2010. Advocaat however simply resigned in April 2010 to sign a new contract at Russia where he could earn a lot more. The Royal Belgian Football Association reacted disappointed and angry at the same time, whereas Advocaat claimed he "did not feel guilty at all". On May 11, Georges Leekens was appointed the new coach, who had already managed the 'Red Devils' between 1997 and 1999.

Friendly matches

World Cup qualifiers
Belgium was in qualifying Group 5 for the 2010 FIFA World Cup but did not manage to qualify.

Belgium U-21

Friendly match

U-21 Championship qualifiers
The Belgium under-21 squad is currently in Group 8 of the qualification process for the 2011 UEFA European Under-21 Football Championship.

This leaves two matches, away to Slovenia and away to France to be played in the next season.

Belgium U-19

Friendly matches

U-19 Championship qualifiers
The Belgium under-19 squad managed to qualify for the elite round qualification process for the 2010 UEFA European Under-19 Football Championship after successfully passing through the first stage of qualifying. However they did not manage to qualify for the tournament proper as they ended second to Croatia in group 1.

Women

Friendly matches

World Cup qualifiers
Belgium was in qualifying Group 8 for the 2011 FIFA Women's World Cup, but failed to qualify.

See also
 2009–10 Belgian First Division
 2009–10 Belgian Cup
 2010 Belgian Super Cup
 Belgian Second Division
 Belgian Third Division: divisions A and B
 Belgian Promotion: divisions A, B, C and D

References

 
Seasons in Belgian football